Major-General Francis Hugh Plowden  (15 August 1851 – 24 August 1911) was a British Army officer.

Military career
Plowden was commissioned into the 43rd (Monmouthshire) Regiment of Foot on 5 October 1872. He commanded 2nd Battalion, the Oxfordshire Light Infantry in skirmishes with Pathans on the North West Frontier of India in 1897 for which he was mentioned in dispatches. During the Second Boer War (1899–1902) he held several temporary appointments in India while the actual holder was with the forces in South Africa. He was an Assistant Adjutant-General in Mhow from March 1900, and held the command of the second class district of Belgaum, Madras Command, from August 1900 (in the absence of Colonel Sir Reginald Hart and then of Hector MacDonald).

He was appointed a Companion of the Order of the Bath in the 1904 Birthday Honours. He then became General Officer Commanding the Northumbrian Division in March 1910 before his death in August 1911.

References

1851 births
1911 deaths
British Army generals
Companions of the Order of the Bath
43rd Regiment of Foot officers
Oxfordshire and Buckinghamshire Light Infantry officers
British Army personnel of the Second Boer War